Manota toomasi is a species of flies belonging to the family Mycetophilidae.

The species is named in honor of Estonian entomologist Toomas Tammaru.

References

Mycetophilidae
Insects described in 2012